Oregon station is a rapid transit station in Philadelphia, Pennsylvania. It could also be:
 Oregon station (Illinois), a historic train station in Oregon, Illinois

See also 
 :Category:Railway stations in Oregon